Hwarangdae Station is an underground Metro Seoul station in Seoul, South Korea, served by the line 6. The station is located in Gongneung-2(Yi) dong located near Korea Military Academy, where its name comes from, Seoul Women's University and Sahmyook University, and it opened in 2000.

Station layout

Exits

 Exit 1: Taeneung Intersection, Sahmyook University, Gongneung Police Office, Gongneung Fire Hall
 Exit 2: Gongneung 2-dong, Gongneung 2-dong Office
 Exit 3: Taeneung Elementary School, Gongneung Middle School, Seoul Women's University
 Exit 4: Korea Military Academy, Taeneung Training Center, Eastern Castle
 Exit 5: Gongneung-dong Public Park
 Exit 6: Jungnang Public Library, Jungnang Sports Center
 Exit 7: Muk 1-dong, Wonmuk Elementary School, Wonmuk Middle School, Taeneung High School

See also
Korea Military Academy
Sahmyook University
Seoul Women's University
Subways in South Korea
Seoul Metropolitan Rapid Transit Corporation
Seoul Metropolitan Subway

References 

Railway stations opened in 2000
Metro stations in Nowon District
Seoul Metropolitan Subway stations